University Teaching Center is an academic building located on the University of Texas at Austin campus. It is adjacent to the Perry–Castañeda Library.

References

University of Texas at Austin campus